Stephen Douglas Fox (17 February 1958 – 1 December 2012) was an English professional footballer who played as a winger. He made 278 appearances in the Football League playing for Birmingham City, Wrexham, Port Vale and Chester City.

He was voted Wrexham's Player of the Year in 1981, and played for the club in the 1979 Welsh Cup final. Whilst with Port Vale he was promoted out of the Fourth Division in 1982–83, and was also voted onto the PFA Team of the Year.

Career

Birmingham City
Fox was born in Tamworth, Staffordshire. He began his football career as a schoolboy with Aston Villa before playing for local club Tamworth F.C. He joined Birmingham City as an apprentice in 1975, signing professional forms in February 1976. He made his Football League debut a year later, as a substitute in a 2–1 defeat away to West Bromwich Albion in the First Division. Despite The Times reporter's view in April 1978 that "Fox looks a fine prospect", the player was unable to hold down a regular first-team place, and joined Second Division club Wrexham in December the same year after manager Arfon Griffiths paid out a £95,000 fee.

Wrexham
He spent nearly four years with Wrexham, during which time he helped the club to reach the Fifth Round of the FA Cup on two occasions and scored in the final of the Welsh Cup in 1979, in which Wrexham lost to Shrewsbury Town on aggregate. He also played and scored for the club in the European Cup Winners' Cup. At the end of the 1980–81 season he was voted the club's Player of the Year. However he was allowed to leave the club due to pressing financial problems at Wrexham. In 2008, the sports editor of the Wrexham Evening Leader selected Fox as a substitute in his "greatest Wrexham team ever".

Port Vale
Fox joined Port Vale in October 1982 after being signed by manager John McGrath as a replacement for the outgoing Mark Chamberlain. He was a regular first-team player in 1982–83, scoring three goals in 35 games, and was included in the PFA select Fourth Division team for that season as the "Valiants" were promoted in third place. He also was a regular the following season, scoring three goals in 47 games, but issued a transfer request and left on a free transfer. He had fallen out with new boss John Rudge, though he later admitted his regret at leaving Vale Park. Rudge said that he "was a skilful wide man who would always create a lot of chances".

Later career
Fox followed John McGrath to Chester City in 1984–85 and 1985–86, although he would not feature for the club again after the opening game of the latter campaign against Halifax Town. His contract was terminated in October 1985 after an argument with new manager Harry McNally. This marked the end of his professional career and he moved into Non-League football with Rhyl (of the Northern Premier League), Llangollen and former club Tamworth.

Style of play
Fox was a pacey winger.

Later life
After retiring as a player, Fox became a landscape gardener. Fox and wife Helen had two children: Matthew and Daniel. Fox was diagnosed with lung cancer in April 2012, and was given six months to live by doctors. He died on 1 December 2012.

Career statistics
Source:

HonoursIndividualWrexham A.F.C. Player of the Year: 1981
PFA Fourth Division Team of the Year: 1982–83WrexhamWelsh Cup runner-up: 1979Port Vale'
Football League Fourth Division third-place promotion: 1982–83

References

1958 births
2012 deaths
Sportspeople from Tamworth, Staffordshire
English footballers
Association football wingers
Tamworth F.C. players
Birmingham City F.C. players
Wrexham A.F.C. players
Port Vale F.C. players
Chester City F.C. players
Rhyl F.C. players
English Football League players
Northern Premier League players
Deaths from lung cancer in England